Scaphinotus elevatus, the eastern snail eater, is a species of ground beetle in the family Carabidae. It is found in North America.

Subspecies
These six subspecies belong to the species Scaphinotus elevatus:
 Scaphinotus elevatus coloradensis Van Dyke, 1907
 Scaphinotus elevatus elevatus (Fabricius, 1787)
 Scaphinotus elevatus flammeus Haldeman, 1844
 Scaphinotus elevatus lengi Van Dyke, 1938
 Scaphinotus elevatus neomexicanus Van Dyke, 1924
 Scaphinotus elevatus tenebricosus Roeschke, 1907

References

Further reading

 

Carabinae
Articles created by Qbugbot
Beetles described in 1787